Cinigiano is a comune (municipality) in the Province of Grosseto in the Italian region Tuscany, located about  south of Florence and about  northeast of Grosseto.

Cinigiano borders the following municipalities: Arcidosso, Campagnatico, Castel del Piano, Civitella Paganico, Montalcino.

Government

Frazioni 
The municipality is formed by the municipal seat of Cinigiano and the villages (frazioni) of Borgo Santa Rita, Castiglioncello Bandini, Monticello Amiata, Poggi del Sasso, Porrona and Sasso d'Ombrone.

List of mayors

References

External links
 Official website